Tiger Rovers Football Club is a Malaysian semi-professional football club based in Setapak, Kuala Lumpur, that competes in the FAS Division 1. Founded in Oktober 2014 and the club's home ground is Ibukota Field  in Taman Ibukota, Setapak, Kuala Lumpur.

Training Ground 

Tiger Rovers F.C are based at Ibukota Field 5, located in Taman Ibukota, Setapak, Kuala Lumpur. All their preparation matches as well as training sessions will be from within the confines of the field. The field complete with facilities such as a toilet, indoor court, playground and a small gym facility. The field can currently train at night with DIY sportlight.

Sponsorship 

Tiger Rovers F.C are sponsored by a single sponsorship. These sponsorships also include partnerships in taking the club to higher levels.

In terms of venue, Tiger Rovers F.C are sponsored by Amanz Network, a famous gadget blog in Malaysia, which agreed to a 1-year sponsorship in late 2017.

Honours and achievements

Honours

League 
 FAS Premier League
 Table (8/8): 2015
 FAS Division One League
 Table (11/15): 2016
 Table (5/7): 2017
 Table (3/6): 2018

Team Officials 
 Manager : Aman Firdaus Bin Abul Hassan
 Assistant Manager: Ikhwan Nazri Bin Mohd Asran
 Head coach: Mohd Shaipul Bin Abd Kadir
 Assistant Head coach : Muhammad Fizuan Bin Fadil
 Goalkeeper Coach:  Muhammad Fizuan Bin Fadil
 Kitman : Isa Al Farouq Bin Mohammad Yunus

Managers

Coaches Staff

Players

Current squad

References

External links

Official Website

Official Facebook Page

Football clubs in Kuala Lumpur
Football clubs in Malaysia